Ann O'Brien is a comic book superheroine created by American comic book artist Art Adams. Along with Axwell Tiberius, she is one of the two primary characters in Adams' Dark Horse Comics series Monkeyman and O'Brien.

Publication history
Ann O'Brien was created by writer/artist Art Adams, who conceived of Monkeyman & O'Brien as series that would enable him to draw monsters similar to the classic movie monsters that he enjoyed in his youth, like Godzilla, King Kong and the Universal Monsters. Adams named O'Brien in tribute to Fay Wray's character, Ann Darrow, from King Kong and that film's special effects creator Willis O'Brien,

The character debuted in Dark Horse Presents #80 (December 1993) in a story titled "A Monkeyman & O'Brien Adventure: Tortorus". She next appeared in a backup story entitled "Who Are Monkeyman and O'Brien?" in Mike Mignola's 1994 series Hellboy: Seed of Destruction. The character made further appearances in several short stories in Dark Horse Presents, a three book limited series titled Monkeyman and O'Brien (1996), and a crossover miniseries Gen 13/Monkeyman and O'Brien (1998). The character's last published appearance was in 1999 in a comic strip in Dark Horse Extra, newspaper style comics fanzine.

Fictional character biography
Ann Darrow O'Brien is the daughter of scientist and explorer, Professor William S. O'Brien. Missing for two years, Professor O'Brien left his daughter Ann and her assistant Akiko Oki living in his palatial Bay Area estate. To the surprise of many, the young Ann had been keeping the estate solvent. Ann's amoral half-sister Oniko (who left the family 15 years earlier to join a mysterious criminal enterprise) and her two henchmen invade the estate to take it over. The sisters have a brawl in an unused dimensional transportation chamber, and Ann accidentally hits a button that kicks off a "life form retrieval beam." The chamber explodes as it summons the giant, simian genius Axewell Tiberius, who's combating an unknown, ape-like enemy. The henchmen escape with Oniko and the still-living head of Tiberius' enemy, while Ann and Akiko befriend Tiberius and give him a place in the estate's library.

O'Brien discovers that the blast in the chamber had released a mysterious radiation that affects both her and Oniko. Immediately after the explosion, her eyes turn orange—the same color as Tiberius's. The next night, she needs almost no sleep to feel refreshed. The next day she finds that her sneakers no longer fit her feet: "I was growing faster than a teenager!" She performs better and better at physical tasks, lifting tons of free weights and at one point making a 60-mile run in 30 minutes without much effort. She frets a little about the ongoing growth spurts (wasting plenty of money on clothes that become too small in 24 hours), but finally settles in at seven feet tall and 250 pounds.

Her new strength, size, and knowledge (from working alongside Tiberius) transform O'Brien from an estate manager to a renowned and fearless adventurer. She joins Tiberius in a series of 1960s-inspired adventures, only a few of which are delineated in the comics. (Author/artist Adams makes references to more adventures, like the "Shrieking Bin-Yak," which are never seen by the readers.) Her eventual goal: Help Tiberius find a way to his home world dimension.

Personality and powers
O'Brien has superhuman strength, superhuman speed, superhuman durability, superhuman agility, superhuman stamina, invulnerability, and the ability to heal quickly from injury. Her strength increases when she get very angry. In a crossover with Gen 13, she was able to defeat an evil version of Caitlin Fairchild with some ease - she had to hold back some of her strength so as not to kill her. Fairchild has many feats with which she could be listed in a "Class 100" level of strength.  This would mean O'brien is above this level as well.  In Monkeyman and O'Brien #3 she is bitten by the Shrewmanoid, bleeds, and then heals within seconds.

References

External links
 Cover image of Darkhorse Presents #80 at darkhorse.com

Female characters in comics
Fictional characters from San Francisco
Fictional female scientists
Characters created by Art Adams
Comics characters introduced in 1993
Comics characters who can move at superhuman speeds
Comics characters with superhuman strength